The Église Saint-Jean-Baptiste du Faubourg is a Roman Catholic church in Aix-en-Provence.

Location
The church building is located at 36 cours Sextius in Aix-en-Provence.

History
The church was built on an old church building. It was designed by architect Laurent Vallon (1652-1724), and built from 1697 to 1702. Its construction was partly funded by a donation from Jean-Baptiste Duchaine, a canon in Aix. The building itself is shaped like a Greek cross. It was expanded in the nineteenth century.

Inside the church, the altar dates back to the eighteenth century. Additionally, the pulpit inside the church was designed by Jean-Baptiste Rambot. A painting by Charles de La Fosse (1636-1716) was donated to the church in 1821. There are also two paintings by Michel Serre (1658–1733).

Painter Paul Cézanne (1839–1906) married Hortense Fiquet in this church.

At present
In December 2013, a traditional Mass was said in provençal to celebrate the santons.

Heritage significance
It has been listed as a monument historique since 1983.

References

18th-century Roman Catholic church buildings in France
Roman Catholic churches in Aix-en-Provence
Monuments historiques of Aix-en-Provence